The Pancharama Kshetras (or the Pancharamas) are five ancient Hindu temples of Shiva in Andhra Pradesh. The Sivalingas at these temples are made from a single Sivalinga.

Legend
As per the legend, a Shiva Lingam was owned by the Rakshasa king Tarakasura. No one could win over him due to the power of this Shiva Lingam. In the war between the Devas and Asuras under Tarakasura, Kartikeya and Tarakasura were face to face. Kartikeya used his Shakti Aayudham to kíll Tarakasura. By the power of Shakti Aayudha the body of Tarakasura was torn to pieces. But to the astonishment of Kartikeya, all the pieces reunited to give rise to Taraka. He repeatedly broke the body into pieces and yet the pieces re-unified repeatedly.

Lord Kumara Swamy was confused and was in an embarrassed state. Lord Sriman Narayana appeared before him and said “Kumara! Don’t get depressed. Without breaking the Shiva Lingam worn by the asura you can’t kíll him” ("You should first break the Shiva Lingam into pieces, then only you can kíll Taraka", meant Lord Vishnu). He said that after breaking, the Shiva Lingam will try to unite. To prevent the Lingam from uniting all the pieces should be fixed in the place where they fall, by way of worshiping them and building temples for them.

By taking the word of Lord Vishnu, Lord Kumara Swamy used his Aagneyaastra (weapon of fire) to break the Shiva Lingam worn by Taraka. The Lingam broke into five pieces and was trying to unite by making Omkara nada (chanting Om). Then Surya Deva by the order of Lord Vishnu, fixed the pieces and worshipped them by building temples over them. By the formation of temples, the pieces stopped their movement and became famous as Panchaarama Kshetras. All the five Shiva Lingams in these five places have scale-like marks on them which are believed to have formed by the power of Aagneyaastra used by Lord Kumara Swamy.

According to legend, these five pieces were installed as Siva Lingams at five temples by Indra, Surya, Chandra, Vishnu and Kumara Swamy at the respective places.

Temples

These places (or Aaramas) are as follows:

Amararama (in Amaravathi village, Palnadu district|Amaravati: Amaravati is in Palnadu district, on the bank of Krishna river. The remaining four are in Godavari districts (two in east Godavari and the other two in west Godavari). Bus facility is good, as all buses will go up to the temple. Amara Lingeswara swami is worshipped by Lord Indra here. The temple is old and in three circles with many temples within the compound. Bala Chamundeswari mata is the goddess here. Venu Gopala Swami temple is also in the campus of the main temple.
Draksharama (in Draksharamam): This is near Ramachandrapuram. The temple is very big and has three circles as compounds. It is under the control of the Archeological department. Lord Shri Rama worshiped Lord Shiva here, followed by Lord Surya and Indra. Manikyamaba devi, one of 18 shaktipeethas is present here.
Somarama (in Bhimavaram): Someswara swami temple is in Gunupudi. It is about 3 to 4 km from the bus stand. The temple looks new, and has a holy pond called Chandra kundam. Chandra kundam is in front of the temple. Lord Chandra got rid of his sins here by worshiping Lord Shiva here. Hence the name Someswara swami. Shivalingam change its color according to the lunar month (black at the time of Amavasya, white at the time of Pournami). Annapurna mata temple is on the second floor.
Ksheerarama (in Palakollu): Ksheera Rama Lingeswara swamy gave Sudarshana chakra to Lord Vishnu here. Upamanya Maharshi got boons and milk from Lord Shiva, hence the name Ksheera (milk) Ramalingeswara swami. The temple is near the bus stand. The temple Gopuram is very high and can be seen from the bus stand. Parvati is the goddess.
Kumararama (in Samalkota): Kumara Bhimeswara swami temple is in Samarlkota. It is about 20 km from Kakinada and about 1 km from Samarlakota Railway station. It is a very old temple under the control of the Archeological department. Lord Shiva is in the form of very big Shivalinga and one can see Shivalinga through second floor. Kumara swami laid down Shiva Linga here, hence the name Kumararamam. Bala Tripura Sundari devi is the goddess.

See also

Samarlakota
Draksharamam
Amaravati
Bhimavaram
Palakollu

References

External links
Pancharamas on Google Maps

 
Hindu holy cities
Shaivism